Scutigerellidae is a family of symphylans. There are at least three genera and 30 described species in Scutigerellidae. The oldest described species of the family are members of the extant genera Hanseniella and Scutigerella from Eocene aged Baltic amber, undescribed specimens of the family are known from the Cenomanian aged Burmese amber of Myanmar.

Genera
 Hanseniella
 Scolopendrelloides
 Scutigerella

References

Further reading

 
 
 

Myriapod families
Myriapods